YKSC may refer to:
 Kingscote Airport, Kangaroo Island, South Australia
 Supreme Court of Yukon, based in Whitehorse, Yukon